The Mass Missile
(ザ マス ミサイル) was formed in September 2000 in Tokyo.
In 2002 the band released their first album independently: Kyoukasho.
Soon after that they made their first tour in Japan.
After the success of the first album they released the mini album Nakama no Uta by Small World Records label in 2003.
In 2004 they signed with Sony Music. That same year they released their first album on a major label: Ningen de Yokatta.
They gained even more prestige when the album's single, Ima Made Nando Mo was chosen as the 5th ending theme of the popular anime series Naruto.
On August 2, 2006, the band released their third album known as Moyori no Yume (最寄りの夢).

Discography

Albums 
 2013 - Masuto (マスト)
 2010 - Aitai Aite (あいたいあいて)
 2008 - Ningen Dozen
 2006 - Moyori no Yume (最寄りの夢)
 2004 - Ningen de Yokatta
 2002 - Kyoukasho

EPs 
 2012 - HOPE#
 2010 - Jerry
 2010 - Mata Au Hi Made 3
 2008 - Arukimakuri
 2003 - Nakama no Uta

Singles 
 2013 - Good Bye (グッド・バイ)
 2010 - Yume to Genjitsu no Hazama ni Kanpeki wa Hitsuyo Nai
 2009 - Ikita Akashi
 2008 - Akiramecha / Mayoi Nagara
 2005 - Ima
 2005 - Haikei
 2005 - Kyoukasho
 2004 - Kimi Ga Ite Kurete Yokatta
 2004 - Ima Made Nandomo

References

External links 
www.massmissile.com

Japanese rock music groups
Sony Music Entertainment Japan artists
Musical groups from Tokyo
Musical groups established in 2000